Cisseps wrightii is a moth of the subfamily Arctiinae. It was described by Stretch in 1885. It is found in California.

References

Ctenuchina
Moths described in 1885